Cenchrus is a widespread genus of plants in the grass family. Its species are native to many countries in Asia, Africa, Australia, the Americas, and various oceanic islands.

Common names include buffelgrasses, sandburs, and sand spur “sticky bur”. Such names allude to the sharp, spine-covered burrs characterizing the inflorescences of the members of the genus.

Some botanists include the genus within the related genus Pennisetum.

 Species
 Cenchrus abyssinicus (Hack.) Morrone - Ethiopia, Tanzania, Yemen, Limpopo, Mpumalanga
 Cenchrus agrimonioides Trin. – kāmanomano - Hawaiian Islands
 Cenchrus arnhemicus (F.Muell.) Morrone - Australia (Western Australia, Northern Territory)
 Cenchrus biflorus Roxb. – kram-kram - Africa, Arabian Peninsula, Indian Subcontinent, Madagascar
 Cenchrus brevisetosus (B.K.Simon) B.K.Simon - Australia (Western Australia, Northern Territory, Queensland)
 Cenchrus brownii Roem. & Schult. - North + South America, West Indies
 Cenchrus caliculatus Cav. - Australia, New Zealand, assorted islands in Pacific + Indian Oceans
 Cenchrus ciliaris L. – buffelgrass  - Africa, Arabian Peninsula, Indian Subcontinent, Sicily; naturalized as a nutritious arid land pasture in parts of North and South America, Australia, Southeast Asia, various islands; considered noxious weed in some places
 Cenchrus distichophyllus  - Cuba
 Cenchrus echinatus L. – common sandbur - North + South America, West Indies; naturalized in parts of Africa, southern Asia, various islands
 Cenchrus elegans Veldkamp - Malesia
 Cenchrus elymoides  - Australia (Western Australia, Northern Territory, Queensland)
 Cenchrus gracillimus Nash - West Indies, southeastern USA
 Cenchrus longispinus (Hack.) Fern. – mat sandbur - Canada, USA, Mexico
 Cenchrus mitis Andersson - Somalia, Kenya, Tanzania, Uganda, Mozambique
 Cenchrus multiflorus J.Presl - Mexico, Central America
 Cenchrus myosuroides Kunth - North + South America, West Indies
 Cenchrus palmeri Vasey - Baja California, Baja California Sur, Sonora, Sinaloa, Arizona
 Cenchrus pennisetiformis Steud. - Africa, Arabian Peninsula, Indian Subcontinent
 Cenchrus pilosus Kunth - from central Mexico to northern Chile
 Cenchrus platyacanthus Andersson - Galápagos
 Cenchrus prieurii  - Sahara, Arabian Peninsula, Indian Subcontinent, Myanmar
 Cenchrus purpureus (Schumach.) Morrone – Africa, Oman
 Cenchrus robustus  - Queensland, New South Wales
 Cenchrus setaceus – tender fountain grass, crimson fountaingrass – northern Africa, southwestern Asia; naturalized in Australia, New Zealand, scattered places in Europe and the Americas
 Cenchrus setiger Vahl - Sahara, East Africa, Arabian Peninsula, Iran, Indian Subcontinent, Myanmar, Andaman & Nicobar
 Cenchrus somalensis  - Somalia
 Cenchrus spinifex Cav. – coastal sandbur - North + South America, West Indies
 Cenchrus tribuloides L. – sanddune sandbur - North + South America, West Indies

 Formerly included
Several species are now considered better suited to other genera:  Anthephora, Centotheca, Dactyloctenium, Echinaria, Echinolaena, Hackelochloa, Hilaria, Pennisetum, Phragmites, Scleria, Setaria, Trachys, Tragus, Tribolium.

See also
 List of Poaceae genera

References

External links
 

 
Poaceae genera
Taxa named by Carl Linnaeus